The Priestley Glacier is a major valley glacier, about  long, originating at the edge of the Polar Plateau of Victoria Land, Antarctica. The glacier drains southeast between the Deep Freeze and Eisenhower Ranges to enter the northern end of the Nansen Ice Sheet.

It was first explored by the Northern Party of the British Antarctic Expedition, 1910–13, and named for Raymond E. Priestley, a geologist with the Northern Party.

Priestley Névé is the névé at the head of Priestley Glacier in Victoria Land. It was named by the New Zealand Antarctic Place-Names Committee in about 1966 in association with Priestley Glacier.

See also
 List of glaciers in the Antarctic
 Ogden Heights
 Szanto Spur
 Wasson Rock

Glaciers of Victoria Land
Scott Coast